Eningen (full name Eningen unter Achalm; Swabian: Ẽnenga ondr dr Achl) is a municipality in the district of Reutlingen, Baden-Württemberg, Germany. It is situated at the foot of the Swabian Alps and near the big cities of Reutlingen and Stuttgart. Although it has a considerable population with around 10,800 inhabitants, its structure is considered to be more the one of a village. The most important annual events include the Dorffest, the village festivity, the Krämerfest, and the Weihnachtsmarkt (the Christmas market). Eningen is surrounded by free-standing hills of the Achalm and the Swabian Alps with landscape full of dark green forests and cliffs. This makes volksmarching, hiking and biking popular.

History
The founding of Eningen is considered to be in the year 1090, through the contract of Bempflingen. At that time, Eningen was only a little village and its destiny was connected with the interests of the church and nobility. Although the village had grown steadily, until the Thirty Years' War, to a stately municipality inhabited by at least 1,300 inhabitants, Eningen was almost completely destroyed as a result of this devastating war. After the war, the municipality started to recover itself, albeit slowly. Over the years, Eningen developed into a major dealer community and has distinguished itself into this day therefore from all the other typical rural villages of the Swabian Alb. In 1843, Eningen had more than 5000 inhabitants and was considered to be "most beautiful and most populous village in the Kingdom of Württemberg". After the Second World War (1945–1949) Eningen was considered a village and belonged to the city of Reutlingen but it could recover fast its traditional independence. Meanwhile, a lot has been done in this place:  new roads and construction sites have been opened, it has got water supply from the Lake of Constance and different industries have established there.  In 1970, Eningen was awarded with a “recreation and health locality recognition”. Today, Eningen counts with an area of approximately 2316 ha; 848 ha among of those are forest or green area. Administratively is  Eningen a municipality of the county of Reutlingen which is assigned to the district of Tübingen in Baden Württemberg. In addition, Eningen counts nowadays with 10 889 inhabitants (as of 05/31/2009).

Infrastructure
Being a municipality, Eningen has its own town hall and also its own post and police offices. Although Eningen is considered to have the structure of a village, it possesses a wide service infrastructure:  two pharmacies, two banks, one public library, one festival hall, one public outdoor swimming pool and more of five parks where people can go to walk and enjoy the nature or children can go to play. Furthermore, Eningen’s educational infrastructure is represented by nine kindergartens, two primary schools, one music school and an adult education center. Regarding to transportation infrastructure, Eningen possesses two different bus connections to Reutlingen, as well as one bus connection to several villages of the Swabian Mountains and one connection to Metzingen. In matters of sport’s infrastructure, Eningen has three sports halls, one sports field, one complex with several tennis fields, one horseback riding field and a one mini golf course.

It is home to many companies including VIAVI Solutions, which was formally known as JDSU and prior to that Wandel & Goltermann.

The artist Gudrun Krüger lived in Eningen for most of her working life.

Eningen is twinned with the town of Calne in Wiltshire, England.

References

Reutlingen (district)